Charan Singh was sworn in as Prime Minister on 28 July 1979, with outside support by India Congress and Yashwantrao Chavan of Congress (Socialist) faction as his Deputy PM. Just before Singh was to prove his majority in Lok Sabha, Indira Gandhi withdrew support to his government, and he resigned on 20 August 1979, after just 23 days, the only PM who has failed to face parliament. He advised President Neelam Sanjiva Reddy to dissolve Lok Sabha. Janata Party leader Jagjivan Ram challenged the advice and sought time to cobble support. But Lok Sabha was dissolved, and Charan Singh continued as caretaker PM until January 1980.

Cabinet

|}

Ministers of state

|}

References

Indian union ministries
Charan Singh administration
1979 establishments in India
1980 disestablishments in India
Cabinets established in 1979
Cabinets disestablished in 1980
Janata Party (Secular)
Indian National Congress (U)
All India Anna Dravida Munnetra Kazhagam